Svend Ringsted (30 August 1893 – 16 March 1975) was a Danish footballer. He played in five matches for the Denmark national football team between 1918 and 1921.

References

1893 births
1975 deaths
Danish men's footballers
Denmark international footballers
People from Qaqortoq
Association football defenders
Akademisk Boldklub players